M. Abdul Latif is a Bangladesh Awami League politician and the incumbent member of parliament for Chittagong-11. Latif is also a trade leader and a former president of the Chittagong Chamber of Commerce & Industry. He is the current board president of Chittagong based football club Chittagong Abahani.

Early life
Latif was born on 10 March 1955. He has completed his Diploma in leather technology.

Career
M. Abdul Latif first entered the political arena as a member of parliament from the constituency Chittagong-10 as an Awami League candidate. Latif was re-elected to Parliament on 5 January 2014 from Chittagong-11 as a Bangladesh Awami League candidate. He is a Member of the Treasury Bench in parliament.

References

Awami League politicians
Living people
1955 births
9th Jatiya Sangsad members
10th Jatiya Sangsad members
11th Jatiya Sangsad members